Aphrahat (c. 280–c. 345;  Ap̄rahaṭ,, and Latin Aphraates) was a Syriac Christian author of the third century from the Persian / Sasanian Empire who composed a series of twenty-three expositions or homilies on points of Christian doctrine and practice. All his known works, the Demonstrations, come from later on in his life. He was an ascetic and celibate, and was almost definitely a son of the covenant (an early Syriac form of communal monasticism). He may have been a bishop, and later Syriac tradition places him at the head of Mar Mattai Monastery near Mosul in what is now northern Iraq. He was a near contemporary to the slightly younger Ephrem the Syrian, but the latter lived within the sphere of the Roman Empire. Called the Persian Sage (Ḥakkimā Pārsāyā), Aphrahat witnessed to the concerns of the early church beyond the eastern boundaries of the Roman Empire.

Life, history and identity
Aphrahat was born near the border of Roman Syria in Neo-Persian Iran around 280, during the rule of Sasnian Emperor Shapur II.
The name Aphrahat is the Syriac version of the Persian name Frahāt, which is the modern Persian Farhād. His ancestors were originally of Persian Jewish ancestry. The author, who was known as "the Persian sage", may have also come from a pagan family and been himself a convert from paganism, though this appears to be later speculation. However, he tells us that he took the Christian name Jacob at his baptism, and is so entitled in the colophon to a manuscript of 512 which contains twelve of his homilies. Hence he was already confused with Jacob of Nisibis, by the time of Gennadius of Massilia (before 496), and the ancient Armenian version of nineteen of The Demonstrations has been published under this latter name. Thorough study of the Demonstrations makes identification with Jacob of Nisibis impossible. Aphrahat, being a Persian subject, cannot have lived at Nisibis, which became Persian only by Emperor Jovian's treaty of 363.

Furthermore, Jacob of Nisibis, who attended the First Council of Nicaea, died in 338, and from the internal evidence of Aphrahat's works he must have witnessed the beginning of the persecution of Christians in the early 340s by Shapur II. The persecutions arose out of political tensions between Rome and Persia, particularly the declaration of Constantine the Great that Rome should be a Christian empire. Shapur perhaps grew anxious that the largely Syriac and Armenian Christians within his Empire might secretly support Rome. There are elements in Aphrahat's writing that show great pastoral concern for his harried flock, caught in the midst of all this turmoil.

It is understood that his name was Aphrahat from comparatively late writers, such as Bar Bahlul (10th century), Elias of Nisibis (11th), Bar Hebraeus and Abdisho bar Berika. He appears to have been quite prominent in the Christian Church of the Persian Empire during the first half of the fourth century. George, bishop of the Arabs, writing in  714 to a friend who had sent him a series of questions about the "Persian sage", confesses ignorance of his name, home and rank, but gathers from his works that he was a monk, and of high esteem in the clergy. The fact that in 344 he was selected to draw up a circular letter from a council of bishops and other clergy to the churches of Ctesiphon and Seleucia and elsewhere (later to become Demonstration 14) is held by William Wright and others to prove that he was a bishop. According to a marginal note in a 14th-century manuscript (B.M. Orient. 1017), he was "bishop of Mar Mattai," a famous monastery near Mosul, but it is unlikely that this institution existed so early.

About "The Demonstrations"
Aphrahat's works are collectively called the Demonstrations, from the identical first word in each of their titles (taḥwîṯâ). They are sometimes also known as "the homilies". There are twenty-three Demonstrations in all. Each work deals with a different item of faith or practice, and is a pastoral homily or exposition. According to Francis Crawford Burkitt, they are intended to form "a full and ordered exposition of the Christian faith." The standpoint is that of the Syriac-speaking church, before it was touched by the Arian controversy. Beginning with faith as the foundation, the writer proceeds to build up the structure of doctrine and duty.

The Demonstrations are works of prose, but frequently, Aphrahat employs a poetic rhythm and imagery to his writing. Each of the first twenty-two Demonstrations begins with each successive letter of the Syriac alphabet (of which there are twenty-two). The Demonstrations were not composed all at one time, but in three distinct periods. The first ten, composed in 337, concern themselves with Christian life and church order, and predate the persecutions. Demonstrations 11–22 were composed at the height of the persecution, in 344. Some of this group deal with matters as before, others focus on apocalyptic themes. However, four Demonstrations are concerned with Judaism. It appears that there was a movement within the Persian church by some either to become Jews or return to Judaism, or to incorporate Jewish elements into Christianity. Aphrahat makes his stand by explaining the meaning of the symbols of circumcision, Passover and Shabbat. The twenty-third Demonstration falls outside of the alphabetic system of the early works, and appears to be slightly later, perhaps near the end of Aphrahat's life. The twenty-third piece takes the symbolism of the grape, drawn from Isaiah chapter 65 and elsewhere, as its cue. It deals with the fulfillment of Messianic promise from Adam to Christ. Aphrahat never strays too far from the Bible in the Demonstrations: he is not given to philosophizing. All of his gospel quotations seem to be drawn from the Diatessaron, the gospel harmony that served the church at his time. Aphrahat's mode of biblical interpretation is strikingly similar to that of the Babylonian rabbinic academies of his day. His position within the church is indicated in Demonstration 14, in which Aphrahat appears to be writing a letter on behalf of his synod to the clergy of Persian capital, Ctesiphon-Seleucia on the Tigris.

In Demonstrations 5, Aphrahat dealt with eschatology. Concerning the beasts of Daniel 7, he identified the first beast as Babylon; the second, Media and Persia; the third, Alexander's Macedonian empire. The four heads of the leopard were the four successors of Alexander. The fourth beast appeared to include both the Macedonian successors of Alexander and the Roman emperors. Its horns he applied to the Seleucid kings down to Antiochus, whom he identified as the Little Horn.

Translations
The Demonstrations were originally composed in the Syriac language, but were quickly translated into other languages. The Armenian version, published by Antonelli in 1756 and containing only 19 homilies, circulated mistakenly under the name Jacob of Nisibis. Important versions in Georgian and Ge'ez exist. A few of the Demonstrations were translated into Arabic, but wrongly attributed to Ephrem the Syrian.

Order and subjects of The Demonstrations
Demonstration on faith — Demonstrations 1–10 were probably written 336–7
Demonstration on charity
Demonstration on fasting
Demonstration on prayer
Demonstration on wars
Demonstration on members of the covenant
Demonstration on penitents
Demonstration on resurrection
Demonstration on humility
Demonstration on pastors
Demonstration on circumcision — Demonstrations 11–22 were probably written 344
Demonstration on the Passover
Demonstration on the Sabbath
Demonstration on preaching
Demonstration on various foods
Demonstration on the call of the Gentiles
Demonstration on Jesus the Messiah
Demonstration on virginity
Demonstration on the dispersion of Israel
Demonstration on almsgiving
Demonstration on persecution
Demonstration on death and the last days
Demonstration concerning the grape — Demonstration 23 was probably written in the winter of 344–5

Notes

References

References noted in  
 Editions by W. Wright (London, 1869), and J. Parisot (with Latin translation, Paris, 1894); the ancient Armenian version of 19 homilies edited, translated into Latin, and annotated by Antonelli (Rome, 1756).
Translations of particular homilies by Gustav Bickell and E. W. Budge; the whole have been translated by G. Bert (Leipzig, 1888).
 C. J. F. Sasse, Proleg. in Aphr. Sapientis Persae sermones homileticos (Leipzig, 1879)
 J. Forget, De Vita et Scriptis Aphraatis (Louvain, 1882)
 F. C. Burkitt, Early Eastern Christianity (London, 1904)
 J. Labourt, Le Christianisme dans l'empire perse (Paris, 1904)
 
 Theodor Zahn, Forschungen I.
 "Aphraates and the Diatessaron," vol. ii. pp. 180–186 of Burkitt's Evangelion Da-Mepharreshe (Cambridge, 1904)
 Articles on "Aphraates and Monasticism," by R. H. Connolly and Burkitt in Journal of Theological Studies (1905) pp. 522–539, (1906) pp. 10–15

Other sources 
 M. Lattke, "„Taufe“ und „untertauchen“ in Aphrahats ܬܚܘܝܬܐ (taḥwyāṯā)", in Ablution, Initiation, and Baptism: Late Antiquity, Early Judaism, and Early Christianity = Waschungen, Initiation und Taufe: Spätantike, Frühes Judentum und Frühes Christentum, ed. David Hellholm, Tor Vegge, Øyvind Norderval, Christer Hellholm (BZNW 176/I–III; Berlin/Boston: De Gruyter, 2011) 1115–38.
Urdang, Laurence. Holidays and Anniversaries of the World. Detroit:Gale Research Company, 1985.

External links

Demonstrations in Syriac with Latin translation.
Lexicon and index to Demonstrations.
English Translations of Demonstrations 1, 5, 6, 8, 10, 17, 21 and 22
Demonstrations 2 and 7 translated (scroll down)
Audience of Pope Benedict XVI on 21 November 2007

Syriac writers
270 births
345 deaths
Mesopotamian saints
4th-century Christian saints
Church Fathers
4th-century Christian theologians
4th-century Iranian people
Christians in the Sasanian Empire
4th-century writers